Perquimans County is a county located in the U.S. state of North Carolina. As of the 2020 census, the population was 13,005. Its county seat is Hertford. The county was originally created as Berkeley Precinct. It was renamed Perquimans Precinct around 1684 and gained county status in 1739. Perquimans County is part of the Elizabeth City, NC Micropolitan Statistical Area, which is also included in the Virginia Beach-Norfolk, VA-NC Combined Statistical Area. The Harvey Point Defense Testing Activity facility is located in Perquimans County.

Geography

Major water bodies
 Albemarle Sound
 Little River
 Perquimans River

Adjacent Counties 
 Tyrrell County - south
 Washington County - south
 Pasquotank County - east
 Chowan County - southwest
 Gates County - northwest

Major highways
  (Concurrency with US 17)

Demographics

2020 census

As of the 2020 United States census, there were 13,005 people, 5,936 households, and 4,023 families residing in the county.

2000 census
As of the census of 2000, there were 11,368 people, 4,645 households, and 3,376 families residing in the county.  The population density was 46 people per square mile (18/km2).  There were 6,043 housing units at an average density of 24 per square mile (9/km2).  The racial makeup of the county was 70.82% White, 27.99% Black or African American, 0.18% Native American, 0.21% Asian, 0.03% Pacific Islander, 0.13% from other races, and 0.64% from two or more races.  0.60% of the population were Hispanic or Latino of any race. There were 4,645 households, of which 28.20% had children under the age of 18 living with them, 56.50% were married couples living together, 12.60% had a female householder with no husband present, and 27.30% were non-families. 24.10% of all households were made up of individuals, and 11.90% had someone living alone who was 65 years of age or older.  The average household size was 2.42 and the average family size was 2.86.

23.00% of the population were under the age of 18, 6.80% from 18 to 24, 24.40% from 25 to 44, 26.60% from 45 to 64, and 19.30% who were 65 years of age or older. The median age was 42 years. For every 100 females there were 91.30 males. For every 100 females age 18 and over, there were 87.50 males.

The median household income was $29,538 and the median family income was $35,212. Males had a median income of $27,251 compared with $18,728 for females. The per capita income for the county was $15,728.  About 13.90% of families and 17.90% of the population were below the poverty line, including 27.20% of those under age 18 and 15.80% of those age 65 or over.

Government and politics

Education
The county is served by Perquimans County Schools.

Communities

Towns
 Hertford (county seat and largest town)
 Winfall

Unincorporated communities
 Belvidere
 Woodville
 New Hope

Townships
 Belvidere
 Bethel
 Hertford
 New Hope
 Parkville

Notable people
 Janice Cole, U.S. Attorney
 Catfish Hunter, professional baseball pitcher for the Kansas City/Oakland A's and New York Yankees
 Wolfman Jack, radio personality

See also
 List of counties in North Carolina
 National Register of Historic Places listings in Perquimans County, North Carolina
 List of future Interstate Highways

References

External links

 
 
 NCGenWeb Perquimans County  - genealogy resources for the county

 
Elizabeth City, North Carolina micropolitan area
1739 establishments in North Carolina
Populated places established in 1739